Ikpoto Eseme  (born 25 May 1957) is a former  Nigerian sprinter who competed at international level winning bronze and gold medals. He also worked as a policeman.

Career

At the 1982 Commonwealth Games in Brisbane Eseme, running as anchor, won a gold medal in the 4 x 100 metres relay, with Iziaq Adeyanju, Lawrence Adegbeingbe, and Samson Olajidie Oyeledun. The winning time of 39.15 seconds was a games record. The medal was the only one won by Nigeria in athletics at the games. Eseme also competed in the 100 metres and 200 metres sprints.

At the 1984 Summer Olympics in Los Angeles Eseme competed in the 4 x 100 metres relay.

In 1987 Eseme came first in the 200 metres sprint at the Nigerian Championship held at Lagos. Then, at the 1987 All-Africa Games in Nairobi, he won a bronze medal in the 200 metres sprint.

Eseme, like a number of other Nigerian competitors, also worked for the Nigeria Police Force and competed in the Police Games.

Awards

In 2003 Eseme, along with the other members of the gold medal winning relay team, received a National Sports Merit award from the Nigerian federal government.

In 2014 Eseme received a Retired Officers for Sports Award from the Nigeria Police Force, presented by Mohammed Dikko Abubakar.

References

Nigerian male sprinters
Commonwealth Games gold medallists for Nigeria
Commonwealth Games medallists in athletics
Athletes (track and field) at the 1982 Commonwealth Games
Athletes (track and field) at the 1984 Summer Olympics
African Games bronze medalists for Nigeria
African Games medalists in athletics (track and field)
Athletes (track and field) at the 1987 All-Africa Games
1957 births
Living people
Nigerian
Olympic athletes of Nigeria
20th-century Nigerian people
21st-century Nigerian people
Medallists at the 1982 Commonwealth Games